The Brigalow Belt is a wide band of acacia-wooded grassland that runs between tropical rainforest of the coast and the semi-arid interior of Queensland, Australia. The 
Interim Biogeographic Regionalisation for Australia (IBRA) divides the Brigalow Belt into two IBRA regions, or bioregions,  Brigalow Belt North (BBN) and Brigalow Belt South (BBS). The North and South Brigalow Belt are two of the 85 bioregions across Australia and the 15 bioregions in Queensland. Together they form most of the Brigalow tropical savanna ecoregion.

Location and description
The Northern Brigalow Belt covers just over 13.5 million hectares and reaches down from just north of Townsville, to Emerald and Rockhampton on the tropic, while the Southern Brigalow Belt runs from there down to the Queensland/New South Wales border and a little beyond until the habitat becomes the eucalyptus dominated Eastern Australian temperate forests.

This large, complex strip of countryside covers an area of undulating to rugged slopes, consisting of ranges as well as plains of ancient sand and clay deposits, basalt and alluvium. The Northern Brigalow Belt includes the coal producing Bowen Basin with the nearby Drummond Basin and the fertile Peak Downs areas while the southern belt runs into the huge Great Artesian Basin with the sandstone gorges of the Carnarvon Range of the Great Dividing Range separating the two areas. The south-west side includes the farming area of Darling Downs.

A number of important rivers drain the Brigalow Belt mostly running eastwards towards the coast, including the large Fitzroy River system and the Belyando and Burdekin rivers near the tropics. The south-western areas drain westwards into the Murray–Darling basin via the Maranoa, Warrego and Condamine Rivers.

The northern belt has tropical summer rains and warm weather all year round, while south of the tropic the winter is slightly cooler and there is more year-round rainfall as well as the summer. All along the belt the interior with less than 500 mm of rainfall per year is drier than the coast which may have 750 mm and more.

Flora

The characteristic plant communities are woodlands of highly water stress tolerant brigalow (Acacia harpophylla), a slender acacia tree which thrives on the clay soil and once covered much of the area especially the fertile lowlands. However most of the brigalow has been cleared to make agricultural land and eucalypt woodlands of silver-leaved and narrow-leaved ironbarks, poplar box and other boxes, blackbutt and coolibah are now intact primarily on the higher slopes.

Dichanthium grasslands are another typical habitat of the area while pockets of thicker woodland of brigalow mixed with Casuarina cristata and ooline occur in moister valleys and vine thickets, wetlands and softwood scrubs are sometimes found although in their undeveloped state, these specialised micro-habitats are rare today. There is a particularly rich variety of habitats in areas such as Isla Gorge  and Blackdown Tableland in the sandstone belt of the Carnarvon Range. The Northern Brigalow Belt is one of fifteen national biodiversity hotspots in Australia.

Fauna
The region is home to the unadorned rock-wallaby and the black-striped wallaby, which lives in the areas of vine thicket along with a wingless dung beetle (Onthophagus apterus). Two endangered mammals are found in the Brigalow Belt; the bridled nail-tail wallaby in Taunton and Idalia National Parks, and the burrowing northern hairy-nosed wombat in the grassland and eucalyptus of Epping Forest National Park. There are also populations of dunnart, wallaby, bat and koala. Birds found here include black-throated finch and russet-tailed thrush, while endemic reptiles include the Fitzroy River turtle.

Already extinct fauna include the white-footed rabbit-rat and the Darling Downs hopping mouse.

Threats and preservation

Much of the brigalow woodland has been cleared or radically reduced to the extent that some wildlife, failing to thrive in the altered environment, has become extinct here with a number of the remaining communities threatened or endangered. The clearance of brigalow and poplar box is ongoing as there are a number of nature reserves of which do protect the various types of habitat found in the Belt including brigalow and eucalyptus woodland, grassland, vine thicket, high peaks, sandstone gorges and wetlands however these tend to be located on the sandstone uplands rather than the fertile lowlands, where the brigalow woodlands are still vulnerable to clearance and are often limited to small areas of parkland. The grasslands of the region are also under threat from introduced pasture grasses such as buffelgrass and weeds such as Congress weed. One particular threat comes from alterations to natural flow patterns caused by the addition of dams and weirs which impact the riverine and floodplain plant and animal species.

Protected areas
A little more than two per cent of the Brigalow Belt lies within national parks and other protected areas.  The largest national parks in the Brigalow Belt are: Taunton (the largest at 115 km2); Epping Forest, Dipperu, Bowling Green Bay, Goodedulla National Park, Chesterton Range National Park, Homevale National Park, Blackdown Tableland National Park, Expedition National Park, and Carnarvon National Park.

Subregions
IBRA subregions of the Brigalow Belt North include Townsville Plains, Bogie River Hills, Cape River Hills, Beucazon Hills, Wyarra Hills, Northern Bowen Basin, Belyando Downs, Upper Belyando Floodout, Anakie Inlier, Basalt Downs, Isaac–Comet Downs, Nebo–Connors Ranges, South Drummond Basin and Marlborough Plains.

References

 Sattler, P. S.  and R. D. Williams (1999) (eds) The Conservation Status of Queensland’s Bioregional ecosystems. Environmental Protection Agency, Brisbane
 IBRA Version 6.1 data. (Search in "Title" for "IBRA").

 
Belt regions
Biogeography of New South Wales
Central Queensland
Ecoregions of Queensland
IBRA regions
Tropical and subtropical grasslands, savannas, and shrublands

fr:Interim Biogeographic Regionalisation for Australia